The Polist is a river in Bezhanitsky District of Pskov Oblast and in Poddorsky and Starorussky District, as well as in the town of Staraya Russa of Novgorod Oblast of Russia. It is technically a tributary of the Lovat though it forms a common river delta with the Lovat and the Pola at the mouth of the Lovat in Lake Ilmen. The principal tributaries of the Polist are the Kholynya (left) and the Porusya (left). The town of Staraya Russa is located on the banks of the Polist.

The source of the Polist is in Lake Polisto in the east of Pskov Oblast, in the western part of the Valdai Hills. The upper course of the Polist id located in the Polist-Lovat Swamp System, one of the biggest raised bog areas in Europe. The Polist flows northeast, enters Novgorod Oblast, and joins the Lovat at its delta. 

The river basin of the Polist comprises the eastern part of Bezhanitsky District, the northwestern halves of Poddorsky and Starorussky Districts, as well as minor areas in the east of Volotovsky District. The major part of Polistovsky Nature Reserve lies in the river basin of the Polist.

The Polist is navigable downstream of Staraya Russa, there is however no regular passenger navigation.

Until the 1980s the Polist was used for timber rafting.

References

External links
 

Rivers of Novgorod Oblast
Rivers of Pskov Oblast